Jeffery Alan Yates (born in Tampa, Florida on May 16, 1969) is an American musician and country songwriter. He is also known by his stage name Jeff Yates.

Education and career 
Yates was born in Tampa, Florida to a military father and a public school administrator mother. He began singing and playing guitar at age 13 and developed his skills while attending high school in rural Northeast Texas. He later graduated from Deer Park High School in Deer Park, Texas. He had a career in law enforcement and real estate investment, but returned to his passion for music after retiring.

He is planning to release his first album, Country Girls Like That in April 2023 in the genre of country music. His self-titled album features ten tracks that showcase his diverse musical style, and each track is a personal story told through his powerful and emotive vocals, backed by catchy melodies and upbeat rhythms. His musical influences are many, including Elvis Presley, George Jones, Mark Chesnutt, Hank Williams Jr, and personal friend, the late Doug Supernaw.

Personal life 
Jeff married Tanya Madison in 1996, and they have one daughter. Jeff and Tanya divorced in 2016. Jeff met his girlfriend, Evette Gates at the end of 2017 after returning to the Houston area from a stay in Nashville, TN.

References 

1969 births
Living people